Shivajinagar Assembly constituency may refer to 
 Shivajinagar, Karnataka Assembly constituency
 Shivajinagar, Maharashtra Assembly constituency